Rauf Akbar (born 22 July 1977) is a Pakistani first-class cricketer who played for Islamabad cricket team.

References

External links
 

1977 births
Living people
Pakistani cricketers
Islamabad cricketers
Cricketers from Multan